Metal-Head is a fictional character from the G.I. Joe: A Real American Hero toyline, comic books and animated series. He is a member of the Iron Grenadiers, and first appeared in the 1990 edition of the toyline. He is not to be mistaken for another character with a similar name Metalhead from G.I. Joe Extreme.

Toys
Metal-Head was first released as an action figure in 1990. A new version of Metal-Head was released in 1994 as part of the Battle Corps line and again in 2005 as part of a Convention Exclusive.

Comics

Marvel Comics
In the Marvel Comics G.I. Joe series, he first appeared in #114. Metal-Head joined Destro's Iron Grenadier army as his anti-tank specialist. When he began working for Cobra, he was there as a double-agent, spying on Cobra Commander for Destro. The Joes first encountered Metal-Head during the Battle of Benzheen when he personally went up against a group of G.I. Joe armored vehicles on foot, armed with his advanced missile system. Before the battle could be won, it was announced that Benzheen's Emir made a deal with Cobra, putting an end to hostilities. Metal-Head soon reported back to Destro in Scotland, warning that Cobra was planning to attack Castle Destro. Cobra Commander proved him right by launching an attack that led to the destruction of the castle. Metal-Head was not seen working for Destro or Cobra for years after the battle.

Devil's Due
In the Devil's Due produced series, Cobra was re-formed in 2001. Later, Metal-Head was seen on Cobra Island working alongside Cobra troops led by Destro, fighting the forces of a revived Serpentor. He is wounded in battle but survives.

Animated series

DiC
Metal-Head had many appearances in the second G.I. Joe animated series produced by DiC Entertainment, voiced by Garry Chalk. Here, he is a childish madman who liked to blast everything and everyone usually screaming "BANG!" while firing weapons (although this makes him a lot more faithful to his filecard). He very much served as a comic relief and a source of frustration for Cobra Commander (thereby not making him as formidable as he might seem and easier for G.I. Joe to take on). In the first season, he was frequently partnered with the Dreadnok, Gnawgahyde and appearing in numerous episodes.

His main weakness appears to be his grandmother, who is clearly disappointed with his lot in life. She appeared in two episodes ("Granny Dearest" and "Metal Head's Reunion").

In "Granny Dearest", in Chicago while Captain Grid-Iron and Pathfinder inside the Battle Bunker arguing that they are lost, Metal-Head's efforts to steal "G.I. Joe's new levitation turbine" are interrupted by a visit from his Granny which led to failure of the mission. While Grid-Iron explaining to Freefall and Pathfinder why they need to transport the "G.I. Joe's new levitation turbine" by train and after a visit to Cobra's base in Lake Michigan, Metal-Head leads another attack on a train being used to test the device with Granny's help, he hijacks the train and brings the turbine to Cobra, where it is installed to power a new Floating Fortress. However, Metal-Head has admitted to his cohorts that he has been lying to his grandmother through letters that GI Joe is an oppressive organization and he is Cobra Commander. Freefall infiltrates the Fortress and uses his knowledge of Metal-Head's fibs to his Granny to maintain cover. He is soon joined by Pathfinder as the Fortress attacks Chicago. Joe forces are unable to dent the Fortress from outside, but when Metal-Head's Granny learns the truth and that Cobra Commander is trying to take control of Chicago (and realizes that "honorable men" like him do not put their feet on the furniture) so she defects by helping Freefall and Pathfinder overload the Fortress's engines while Grid-Iron with others Joes are fighting the Cobra troops and pushing back their attacks. She later admits to Pathfinder that her grandson is a good boy, but fell in with Cobra out of an "I want to rule the world" phase in his life.

In the second season he had numerous appearances but in the DiC final episode, "Metal-Head's Reunion", it was revealed that he and Captain Grid-Iron both attended the same school and both have interest in Susan Winters, who is the high school sweetheart of Grid-Iron, although Metal-Head wants to impress her but at the same time steal the secret formula for Cobra Commander and Destro to use it against the Joes.

Video games
Metal-Head appeared as a boss in the 1991 G.I. Joe video game for the Nintendo Entertainment System, and in the 1992 G.I. Joe arcade game.

References

External links
 Metal-Head at JMM's G.I. Joe Comics Home Page
 Metal-Head at YOJOE.com

Villains in animated television series
Cobra (G.I. Joe) agents
Fictional characters from Maryland
Fictional soldiers
Television characters introduced in 1990